Paul Lee (born October 7, 1960) is an American politician who has served in the Alabama House of Representatives from the 86th district since 2010.

References

1960 births
Living people
Republican Party members of the Alabama House of Representatives
21st-century American politicians